Minna is a female given name. In Germany, Minna is a nickname of Wilhelmina or Hermina. It is also a Finnish short form of Vilhelmina. The similar form of Wilma and Willa.

Name days 
Czech: 7 April (Hermina) or 7 January (Wilhelmina)
Latvia: 14 October
Finland, Estonia: 26 May

Given name 
Minna Aaltonen (born 1966), Finnish actress
Minna Atherton (born 2000), Australian backstroke swimmer
Minna Canth (1844–1897), Finnish writer and social activist
Minna Citron (1896–1991), American painter
Minna Freimane (1853–1888), Latvian writer
Minna Gale (1869–1944), American actress
Minna Haapkylä (born 1973), Finnish actress
Minna Herzlieb (1789-1865), German journalist
Minna Planer (1809–1866), German actress
Minna Salmela (born 1971), Finnish freestyle swimmer
Minna Cauer (1841-1922), German educator, journalist and radical activist within the middle-class women's movement

Surname
Maria Minna (born 1948), Canadian politician

Name variants 
Minna (German), (English), (Danish), (Latvian)
Minka (Polish), (Bulgarian)
Mína (Czech), (Slovak), (Bulgarian)
Miina (Estonian), (Finnish)

See also
 Mina (given name)
 Minnie (disambiguation)

English feminine given names
Estonian feminine given names
Finnish feminine given names
German feminine given names
Latvian feminine given names
Polish feminine given names
Czech feminine given names
Slovak feminine given names
Danish feminine given names